A by-election was held for the New South Wales Legislative Assembly electorate of Hamilton on 24 February 1934 because of the death of Hugh Connell,.

Dates

Result

Preferences were not distributed.The by-election was triggered by the death of Hugh Connell,.

See also
Electoral results for the district of Hamilton (New South Wales)
List of New South Wales state by-elections

References

New South Wales state by-elections
1934 elections in Australia
1930s in New South Wales